José António de Miranda da Silva Júnior (born April 27, 1985 in Rio de Janeiro), or simply Júnior Carioca, is a Brazilian football midfielder.

Career
Júnior Carioca signed a contract with Náutico at the start of Campeonato Brasileiro Série A in May. However, he was released in July 2009.

Honours
 Flamengo
Brazilian Cup: 2006

References

External links

 
 

Tombense Futebol Clube players
CR Flamengo footballers
Grêmio Foot-Ball Porto Alegrense players
Clube Atlético Mineiro players
Clube Náutico Capibaribe players
1985 births
Living people
Association football midfielders
Footballers from Rio de Janeiro (city)
Brazilian footballers